The 2018 Italian motorcycle Grand Prix was the sixth round of the 2018 Grand Prix motorcycle racing season. It was held at the Mugello Circuit in Scarperia on 3 June 2018.

Classification

MotoGP

 Michele Pirro suffered a concussion and dislocated shoulder in a crash during free practice and withdrew from the event.

Moto2

Moto3

Championship standings after the race

MotoGP

Moto2

Moto3

References

Italy
Motorcycle Grand Prix
Italian motorcycle Grand Prix
Italian motorcycle Grand Prix